Hanyeong College (hangul: 한영대학, hanja: 漢永大學) is a private college located in Yeosu, Jeollanam-do established in 1992 with the School of Constitutional Conscription. On March 9, 1993, 480 freshmen from 6 departments and schools entered Hanyeong Technical College. In 1995, 242 students made up the first graduating class. In 1998, Hanyeong Technical College changed its name to Yeosu Technical College and was renamed Hanyeong College as of 2002.

References

External links
 Official website

See also
List of universities and colleges in South Korea

Universities and colleges in South Jeolla Province
1992 establishments in South Korea
Universities and colleges in South Korea
Yeosu
Educational institutions established in 1992